UDI may refer to:

Organisations
 Independent Democratic Union (Unión Demócrata Independiente), a political party in Chile
 Union of Democrats and Independents, a political party in France
 United Defense Industries, a supplier of land warfare systems, now part of BAE Systems Land and Armaments
 United Diving Instructors, a diver training organization

Technology
 Uniform Driver Interface, a project to develop portable device drivers
 Unified Display Interface, digital video interface specification based on DVI
 Universal Disk Image, a disk image format
 Unique Device Identification, a system that is intended to assign a unique identifier to medical devices within the United States
 Unrestricted Digital Information, a type of Circuit Switched Data Bearer Capability service commonly used with GSM cellular networks

Other uses
 Unilateral declaration of independence, an assertion of the independence of an aspiring state or states
 Rhodesia's Unilateral Declaration of Independence, in November 1965
 Mexican unidad de inversión, Mexican currency funds unit
 Universal design for instruction, an educational framework

See also
 Udi (disambiguation)